Jeffrey Ernest John Spender  is a former Judge of the Federal Court of Australia that served from 17 May 1984 to 19 July 2010.

Jeff Spender graduated from the University of Queensland in 1964 with a Bachelor of Science, with honours in Mathematics. From 1967 until 1984 he practised at the Queensland Bar. In 1968 he obtained a Bachelor of Arts and a Bachelor of Laws at the University of Queensland. In 1972 Spender graduated from the University of London with a Master of Laws. In 1983, he was appointed Queen's Counsel.

Spender served as a presidential member of the Administrative Appeals Tribunal, and as a judge of the Industrial Relations Court of Australia. He served as an additional judge of the Supreme Court of the Australian Capital Territory. He was appointed a member of the Court of Appeal of the Kingdom of Tonga in 2001.

References 

Judges of the Federal Court of Australia
Living people
Alumni of the University of London
University of Queensland alumni
Court of Appeal of Tonga justices
Australian judges on the courts of Tonga
Judges of the Industrial Relations Court of Australia
20th-century Australian judges
21st-century Australian judges
Year of birth missing (living people)
Australian King's Counsel